The 2013–14 Buffalo Sabres season was the 44th season for the National Hockey League (NHL) franchise that was established on May 22, 1970. The Sabres moved to the realigned Atlantic Division, which included the previous season's Northeast Division with the addition of the Tampa Bay Lightning, Florida Panthers and Detroit Red Wings. Ron Rolston, who started the season as head coach, was fired after 20 games and replaced by Ted Nolan, who had previously coached the team from 1995 to 1997.

Off-season
Ron Rolston was made the permanent head coach when Darcy Regier removed the interim tag from his title. Regier did not interview any other candidates for the position. Rolston replaced Lindy Ruff who was fired the season before after serving as head coach for nearly 16 seasons.

Training camp 
The Sabres' training camp saw the arrival of many highly touted prospects into the Sabres' lineup. Newly acquired first round picks Rasmus Ristolainen and Nikita Zadorov both made the opening day roster along with 2012 first round picks Mikhail Grigorenko, Zemgus Girgensons and 2011 first round pick Joel Armia. Armia and Zadorov were both injured in the pre-season and would not play right away.

The pre-season saw the Sabres involved in a controversial game. In a road game at the Toronto Maple Leafs, a fight between Corey Tropp and Toronto winger  Jamie Devane ended with Tropp injured. On the ensuing faceoff, Sabres' enforcer John Scott lined up opposite to Phil Kessel and attempted to engage him in a fight. A line brawl followed in which 209 minutes in penalties were handed out, including 11 fighting majors and 14 ten-minute misconduct penalties. During the fight, Maple Leaf David Clarkson would leave the bench to fight. Clarkson would later be suspended by the NHL for ten regular season games. Phil Kessel received a three-game pre-season game ban for slashing Scott with the intent to injure. Sabres Head Coach Ron Rolston was fined an undisclosed amount for "player selection." The fine was controversial due to the fact that Scott was on the ice the previous shift and the Leafs, being the home team, had last change. Corey Tropp suffered a broken jaw and concussion in the fight.

The day before the start of the regular season, Rolston named the new team captain. With the trade of team captain Jason Pominville the year before, the captaincy had remained vacant. Rolston used a rotating captaincy in the preseason. Steve Ott and Thomas Vanek were named co-captains for the 2013–14 season. Ott would wear the "C" for all road games and Vanek would wear it at home. Christian Ehrhoff would wear an "A" during all games.

Regular season
Opening the season with a lineup that featured Zemgus Girgensons, Mikhail Grigorenko, Rasmus Ristolainen and Nikita Zadorov, the 2013–14 Sabres were the first team since the 1995–96 season to include four teenagers.

On November 13, 2013, general manager Darcy Regier and Head Coach Ron Rolston were relieved of their duties. Former Sabre Pat LaFontaine was hired as President of Hockey Operations (a position that had been left vacant since the departure of Larry Quinn in 2011) and Ted Nolan was hired as the interim head coach. After hiring Ottawa Senators' Assistant general manager Tim Murray to the vacant general manager position on January 9, Pat LaFontaine resigned as President of Hockey Operations on March 1, 2014, to return to his previous position with the NHL.

The Sabres made numerous trades leading up to and right before the March 5 trading deadline. On February 28, they traded away veterans Ryan Miller and Steve Ott to the St. Louis Blues. Then on March 5, the NHL trade deadline day, they made three separate trades with the Minnesota Wild, Washington Capitals and Los Angeles Kings.

Standings

Schedule and results

Pre-season

Regular season

Playoffs

The Sabres failed to qualify for the playoffs for the third straight year.

Player stats 
Final stats
Skaters

Goaltenders

†Denotes player spent time with another team before joining the Sabres. Stats reflect time with the Sabres only.
‡Denotes player was traded mid-season. Stats reflect time with the Sabres only.
Bold/italics denotes franchise record.

Milestones

Transactions 
The Sabres have been involved in the following transactions during the 2013–14 season:

Trades

Free agents acquired

Free agents lost

Claimed via waivers

Lost via waivers

Lost via retirement

Players released

Player signings

Draft picks

Buffalo Sabres' picks at the 2013 NHL Entry Draft, to be held in Newark, New Jersey on June 30, 2013.

Draft notes
 The Minnesota Wild's first-round pick went to the Buffalo Sabres as a result of an April 3, 2013, trade that sent Jason Pominville and a 2014 fourth-round pick to the Wild in exchange for Johan Larsson, Matt Hackett and this pick.
 The Carolina Hurricanes' second-round pick went to the Buffalo Sabres at the draft in a trade that sent Andrej Sekera to Carolina for Jamie McBain and this pick.
 The St. Louis Blues' second-round pick went to the Buffalo Sabres as a result of a March 30, 2013, trade that sent Jordan Leopold to the Blues in exchange for a conditional 2013 fifth-round pick and this pick.
 The Buffalo Sabres' fourth-round pick went to the Nashville Predators as the result of a February 27, 2012, trade that sent a 2012 first-round pick (#21–Mark Jankowski) to the Sabres in exchange for Paul Gaustad and this pick.
 The New Jersey Devils' fifth-round pick went to the Buffalo Sabres (via Los Angeles and Florida), Florida traded this pick to Buffalo as a result of a March 15, 2013, trade that sent T. J. Brennan to the Panthers in exchange for this pick.
 The St. Louis Blues' fifth-round pick went to the Buffalo Sabres as a result of a March 30, 2013, trade that sent Jordan Leopold to the Blues in exchange for a 2013 second-round pick and this pick.

References

Buffalo Sabres seasons
Buffalo Sabres season, 2013-14
Buf
Buffalo
Buffalo